Old Christians GAA (Gaelic Athletic Association) was formed in Limerick, Ireland in 1962 for the development of the games of Hurling and Gaelic Football in the southern part of the city. Since then the club has gone on to develop many league and championship winning teams at all level and has contributed to the county with many noteworthy players including Bernie Hartigan who won an All-Ireland Senior Hurling Championship with Limerick in 1973. Ger Hegarty also won a Munster title and a National Hurling League medal in the mid-1990s.

Location
The club is centred on Our Lady Queen of Peace parish which is a working class parish on the southside of Limerick City but players also come from Our Lady of Lourdes and Holy Family parishes. The main areas that provide players include Rathbane, Janesboro, Kennedy Park, Prospect, Ballinacurra Weston, Roxboro and Southill.

History
Prior to the foundation of the club sportsmen of the area played with South Liberties GAA or other city clubs such as the Commercials, Young Irelanders or Claughaun GAA. The club was originally set up in 1962 both to provide a GAA club for past pupils of Sexton Street CBS hence the name 'Old Christians' and also to promote hurling and football on the southside of the city in an area where rugby and in particular soccer would have had the upper hand. Even though they won the 1962 Limerick Senior Football Championship in their first year with victory over Claughaun, their main concern was hurling in those early years and their under-14 team won the All-Ireland Féile na nGael title in 1972 beating Nenagh Éire Óg GAA, the club's greatest ever hurling achievement. They continued to hurl at a senior level up to the mid 1970s when the club went into decline, as not as many hurlers were coming out of Sexton Street CBS to play with 'Christians'. Old Christians went on to win both Minor County Championships in hurling and football in 1966.

However the 1980s saw a revival and the club won several underage city and county titles. The minor hurlers reached the county final in 1984 under the Southill/Old Christians name. The popularity of football also grew and footballers played with the neighbouring Ballinacurra Gaels club and later in hurling as well in the 1990s. Old Christians won the 1992 County Intermediate Hurling Championship but they struggled to compete at senior level and were constantly fighting relegation. They were eventually relegated back to the intermediate grade in 1999 and they were back to playing junior A by 2007. They have progressed though at underage and have won numerous county titles over the last ten years, including the County Under-14 A Football title in 2013. At adult level they field a Junior A hurling team in the City Championship but no football team, who are catered for by sister club Ballinacurra Gaels at Junior B level.

Grounds
Old Christians have been playing at various locations around the Rathbane area since their foundation in 1962. They bought a side in Rathbane off of the City Council in the early 2000s and now have two full sized pitches along with a clubhouse containing a sports hall and gym and dressing rooms.

Famous Players
 Bernie Hartigan
 Ger Hegarty

External links
 Website

Gaelic games clubs in County Limerick
Hurling clubs in County Limerick
Gaelic football clubs in County Limerick